Whitegate, Ireland may refer to:

Whitegate, County Clare
Whitegate, County Cork